A teaching order is a Catholic religious institute whose particular charism is education. Many orders and societies sponsor educational programs and institutions, and teaching orders participate in other charitable and spiritual activities; a teaching order is distinguished in that education is a primary mission.

Description
Teaching orders may operate their own institutions, from primary school through the university level, provide staff to diocesan or other Catholic schools, or otherwise contribute to educational ministries.

Such teaching orders include the following:

 Apostolic Carmel Sisters (Congregation of the Apostolic Carmel)
 Basilian Fathers (Congregation of St. Basil)
 Brigidine Sisters
 Brotherhood of Hope - evangelization at secular universities
 Brothers of Our Lady of Lourdes - education of youth
 Carmelites of Mary Immaculate - seminaries and training of priests; education of youth
 Christian Brothers (Irish) (Congregation of Christian Brothers) - education of the materially poor
 Congregation of Saint Thérèse of Lisieux 
 De La Salle Christian Brothers (Institute of the Brothers of the Christian Schools)
Dominicans (Order of Preachers)
 Gabrielite Brothers (Brothers of Christian Instruction of St Gabriel) - education of youth
 Grey Ursulines (Congregation of the Ursulines of the Agonizing Heart of Jesus)
 Society of the Holy Child Jesus - education of youth in a nurturing environment
 Congregation of Holy Cross - education of youth, especially in matters of faith
 Holy Ghost Fathers, or Spiritans (Congregation of the Holy Spirit)
 Religious Teachers Filippini (Pontifical Institute of the Religious Teachers Filippini)  - education of youth and of adults, especially women
 Jesuits (Society of Jesus)
 Josephites, or Brown Joeys (Sisters of St Joseph of the Sacred Heart) - education of the poor and in rural areas
 Loreto Sisters (Institute of the Blessed Virgin Mary)
 Loretto Community (Sisters of Loretto)
 Marianists (Society of Mary) - education of youth
 Marianites of Holy Cross - evangelization through education
 Marist Brothers (Little Brothers of Mary) - education of youth, especially the "most neglected"
 Piarists (Order of Poor Clerks Regular of the Mother of God of the Pious Schools) - education of youth
 Presentation Brothers (Congregation of Presentation Brothers) -  
 Presentation Sisters (Sisters of the Presentation of the Blessed Virgin Mary) - education in parochial schools
 Sacred Heart Brothers - education of youth
 Salesians of Don Bosco - education and evangelization of youth
 School Sisters of Notre Dame
 Sisters of Charity of New York - education in a "caring environment"
 Sisters of Charity of Saint Elizabeth
 Sisters of Charity of Seton Hill
 Sisters of Charity of the Blessed Virgin Mary
 Sisters of the Holy Names of Jesus and Mary
 Sisters of Holy Cross - education of the underserved
 Sisters of Notre Dame de Namur
 Sisters, Servants of the Immaculate Heart of Mary
 Sisters of Saint Paul of Chartres
 Sulpicians (Society of Saint-Sulpice) - education of clergy
 Viatorians (Clerics of Saint Viator)
 Xaverian Brothers (Congregation of St. Francis Xavier) - education of youth

See also
 Mendicant order
 Missionary order

References